Portus Baxter (December 4, 1806 – March 4, 1868) was a nineteenth-century banker, farmer, and politician from Vermont. He served as a U.S. Representative from the state's 3rd Congressional District from 1861 to 1867.

Early life
Baxter was born in Brownington, Vermont, the son of William and Lydia (Ashley) Baxter. After attending local schools, he graduated from Norwich Military Academy in 1824, and entered the University of Vermont in Burlington. He left UVM in 1826 after his father's death, and was responsible for administering his father's estate.  (In 1852, UVM conferred on Baxter the honorary degree of Master of Arts.) He moved to Derby Line, Vermont, in 1828, where he engaged in agricultural and mercantile pursuits, which took him down the Connecticut River valley and into Canada. He was one of the original incorporators of the Connecticut and Passumpsic Rivers Railroad, which was planned to run almost the entire length of the state on the eastern border.

Politics
He became interested in politics early in his career. Baxter served as Assistant Judge of Orleans County from 1846 to 1847. He was the only Whig delegate from New England who supported Zachary Taylor for president in 1848. He also strongly supported Winfield Scott in his unsuccessful bid for the presidency in 1852. He became a Republican when the party was founded, and was a presidential elector for John Fremont in 1856.

In 1860, after many years of urging, he finally ran for Congress, was successful and eventually served three terms, from March 4, 1861, to March 3, 1867, in the 37th, 38th, and 39th Congresses. During the 38th Congress, he chaired the Committee on Expenditures in the Department of the Navy. He also served on the Agriculture and Elections Committees.

Civil War
Baxter's time in Congress coincided with the four years of the American Civil War, and he was such a proponent of Vermont soldiers he earned the nickname, 'the soldier's friend.'  One Vermonter's letters document instances where Mrs. Baxter, and other wives and daughters of Vermont's Congressional contingent, were strong supporters of the efforts of the Christian Commission. Baxter also frequently visited the regiments in the area immediately surrounding Washington, D.C., watching out for a son who had joined the 11th Vermont Infantry, and sponsoring others in their efforts to get promoted. During the bloody Battle of the Wilderness in May 1864, Baxter and his wife spent so much time in the hospitals in and around Fredericksburg, Virginia, tending to wounded soldiers, that they themselves suffered from exhaustion and eventually had to leave to recuperate.

Post Civil War
He remained in Washington, D.C. after completing his last term.  Baxter suffered from asthma, and he died of pneumonia after a few days' illness. His was buried in the village cemetery in Strafford, Vermont.

Baxter General Hospital, the Civil War soldier's hospital in Burlington, was named for Baxter, as was Portus Baxter Park in Derby Line.

Family
His wife, Ellen Jannette Harris (1811–1882), daughter of Judge Jedediah Hyde Harris of Strafford, whom he married on June 19, 1832, survived him by fourteen years. They had eight children, four of whom lived to adulthood.  The most notable was Jedediah Hyde Baxter, who served as Surgeon General of the United States Army.

Judge Harris was the business partner of Senator Justin Smith Morrill.  Baxter and Morrill became close friends as a result of the connection to Harris, with Morrill referring to Baxter as "one of nature's noblemen" and Baxter consciously patterning his business and political career on Morrill's.

References

Further reading
 "Baxter, Portus (1806–1868)," Biographical Directory of the United States Congress, 1774 – Present, sited August 13, 2006, 
 Crockett, Walter Hill. Vermont The Green Mountain State, The Century History Company, Inc., New York, 1921, iii:272, 366, 368, 402, 412, 431, 490, 551, 573, 615, iv:3, 28–29.
 Dodge, Prentiss C., Encyclopedia Vermont Biography, Burlington, VT: Ullery Publishing Company, 1912, p. 74
 Ullery, Jacob G., compiler, Men of Vermont: An Illustrated Biographical History of Vermonters and Sons of Vermont, Brattleboro, VT: Transcript Publishing Company, 1894, Part I, p. 156

External links 
 Biographical Directory of the United States Congress: BAXTER, Portus, (1806–1868)
 Vermont in the Civil War: Portus Baxter Obituary
 
 Portus Baxter's biography from the Vermont Historical Gazetteer
 Govtrack.us: Rep. Portus Baxter
 Old Stone House Museum: Hon. Portus Baxter
 The Political Graveyard:  Baxter, Portus (1806–1868)

1806 births
1868 deaths
People from Brownington, Vermont
American people of English descent
Vermont Whigs
Republican Party members of the United States House of Representatives from Vermont
Vermont state court judges
19th-century American judges
Norwich University alumni
People of Vermont in the American Civil War
Deaths from asthma
Deaths from pneumonia in Washington, D.C.
Burials in Vermont